Keramitsa (Greek: Κεραμίτσα) is perched 620m, half way up Mount Velouna, in the rugged mountains of Eastern Mourgána (1806m). On the foothills of which many a bloody battle of the Greek Civil War (1943 to 1949) were fought.

After the 2011 administrative division reforms “Kalikratis”, it is part of the municipality of Filiátes, in the regional unit of Thesprotía, Epirus, Greece. 

It is located between the villages of Kokkinolithári, Ravení, and Maloúni, situated 22km northeast of Filiates, 55km west of Ioánnina, and 35km northeast of the busy port of the regional capital, Igoumenítsa, on the Ionian Sea.

Nowadays, it’s a relatively small village with approximately 150 permanent residents, including those of its hamlets - Préspa, Zovóri, and Hoúria. Not so long ago however, it was the largest regional hub, equipped with a playground, basketball court, recreation hall, primary school, high school, police station, postoffice, telecommunications office, mini market, a butcher store, and 3 taverns. It had a staggering 500 permanent residents, 100 of which resided in the aforementioned hamlets. Nevertheless, during  summer this number could reach 1500 when expatriates and their descendants would visit from other parts of Greece (mostly Athens), as well as other countries: Germany, The United States, Australia, South Africa, among others.

Times have changed nonetheless, yet it is renowned in the area for its perpetually running crystal-clean natural spring water at the quaint hewn stone Pigádi (water-well) under the omnipresent Plane & Pine trees. Additionally, the main square in the centre of the village (mesohóri), dominated by the historical hewn stone bell tower erected in 1828, is where you can enjoy a quick coffee break at the local Kafenio, or a relaxed food stop at the Taverna under the thick cool shade of the bicentennial Plane trees.

During the 1800s, the Skala of Keramitsa, a cobbled path once part of the old Egnatia Odos  was one of the biggest intersecting stations, (hánia - Inn’s), on the historical trails where countless caravans supported the flow of commerce, information, and people, across a network of trade routes through the mountains covering all northern Greece. Connecting the coasts of Thesprotía with Ioánnina, Yugoslavia, Bulgaria, Romania - all the way to Moldavlachia. - Travel to Epirus, to Constantinople, to Albania and to several other parts of the Ottoman Empire — François Pouqueville (1770-1838) 

Populated places in Thesprotia